The Kmehlener Berge are a group of low hills in the south of the German state of  Brandenburg within the county of Oberspreewald-Lausitz near the town of Ortrand and the village of Großkmehlen on the state border with Saxony. The  Kutschenberg, about 1,000 metres northeast, rises to a height of 201 m and is the highest summit and second highest point in the state of Brandenburg.

Hills of Brandenburg
Elbe-Elster Land